Tamtert, also written Tamert or Tamatart is a town and commune in Béni Abbès District, Béchar Province, in western Algeria. According to the 2008 census its population is 1,248, down from 1,302 in 1998, with an annual growth rate of -0.4%.

Geography
The Grand Erg Occidental, a large area of continuous sand dunes lies to the east, while the rocky ridges of the Ougarta Range rise to the west, running from northwest to southeast along the opposite side of the river from the town beyond a barren, rocky plain.

Climate

Tamtert has a hot desert climate (Köppen climate classification BWh), with extremely hot summers and warm winters, and very little precipitation throughout the year.

Economy

Agriculture is the main industry in Tamtert. There are a total of 26,250 date palms planted in the commune. As of 2009 there were 270 sheep, 744 goats, and 585 camels. There were also 8,400 chickens.

Infrastructure and housing

90% of Tamtert's population is connected to drinking water, 90% is connected to the sewerage system, and 99% (including 271 buildings) have access to electricity. There are no one fuel services station in the town; the nearest is in El Ouata.

Tamtert has a total of 364 houses, of which 165 are occupied, giving an occupation rate of 7.6 inhabitants per occupied building.

Transportation
Tamtert is connected by a local road to the N6 national highway between Béchar to the northwest and Adrar to the southeast. Towns accessible to the north via the N6 include Béni Abbès and Igli, while to the south the towns of El Ouata, Béni Ikhlef, Kerzaz, and Ouled Khoudir can be accessed. Local roads also connect the town directly to the district centers of Béni Abbès and El Ouata.

Education

There are 3 elementary schools, with 15 classrooms including 13 in use. There are a total of 105 school students; secondary students study in Béni Abbès or El Ouata.

5.1% of the population has a tertiary education, and another 14.3% has competed secondary education. The overall literacy rate is 73.4%, and is 81.9% among males and 65.5% among females.

Health

Tamtert has very few health facilities, with just one room care facility. The nearest polyclinics are in El Ouata, and the nearest hospital is in Béni Abbès.

Religion

Tamtert has 3 operational mosques, with another 2 under construction.

Localities
The commune is composed of four localities:

Tamtert
Béchir
Marhouma
Idigh

Béchir and Marhouma lie along the Oued Saoura to the northwest between Tamtert town and Béni Abbès, while Idigh lies to the southeast about halfway to El Ouata.

References

Neighbouring towns and cities

Communes of Béchar Province
Cities in Algeria
Algeria